Shao Yiwen 邵依雯 is a Chinese swimmer from Hangzhou. A gold (Women's 400 metre freestyle) and silver (Women's 800 metre freestyle) 2010 Asian Games medalist, she competed at the 2012 Summer Olympics in the Women's 400 metre freestyle, finishing 14th in the heats, failing to qualify for the final. She finished 9th in the heats of the Women's 800 metre freestyle.

References

Year of birth missing (living people)
Living people
Olympic swimmers of China
Swimmers at the 2012 Summer Olympics
Swimmers from Zhejiang
Sportspeople from Hangzhou
Asian Games medalists in swimming
Swimmers at the 2010 Asian Games
World Aquatics Championships medalists in swimming
Asian Games gold medalists for China
Asian Games silver medalists for China
Medalists at the 2010 Asian Games
Chinese female freestyle swimmers
21st-century Chinese women